Rajendra Setu, or Simaria Bridge, is a bridge across the Ganges that was the first to link the northern and southern portions of the state of Bihar. The location of the bridge was based on the work of M. Visvesvaraya, who was more than 90 years old at the time. In a wheelchair, he visited the bridge site on the special request of Bihar's chief minister, Shri Krishna Sinha. It was the first bridge over the Ganges to be built in independent India (after 1947).

The road-cum-rail bridge near Hathidah in Patna district and Simaria in Begusarai district was inaugurated in 1959 by Jawaharlal Nehru, prime minister of India, and Shri Krishna Sinha. The bridge was constructed by Braithwaite, Burn & Jessop Construction Company.

A new bridge, carrying the four-lane NH 31 and double-track rail, 25 metres upstream from the existing rail and road bridge, was planned in 2011.

The construction of the new parallel double-line railway bridge was inaugurated by prime minister Narendra Modi on 12 March 2016. The new 1.9 km railway bridge was supposed to be operational by February 2021, but is now expected to be operational by 2024. The contract for construction of the new bridge was awarded to M/s AFCONS Infrastructure Ltd by the Indian Railway Construction Company Limited (IRCON) on an EPC contract basis. Construction has also started on a new six-lane road bridge, which has a span of 34 metres, parallel to it, which is supposed to become operational by December 2023.

See also
 List of longest bridges in the world
 List of longest bridges above water in India
 Digha–Sonpur bridge
List of bridges in India

References

 

Bridges in Bihar
Patna district
Begusarai district
Bridges over the Ganges
Road bridges in India
Railway bridges in India
Bridges completed in 1959
Memorials to Rajendra Prasad
Road-rail bridges in India
Double-decker bridges
20th-century architecture in India